Dusseldorp may refer to:

the Dutch name Düsseldorf
, a village in Castricum, Netherlands

People with the surname
Dick Dusseldorp (1918–2000), Dutch engineer and Australian building contractor (Civil and Civic)
Marta Dusseldorp (born 1973), Australian actress
Stef Dusseldorp (born 1989), Dutch racing driver